Jerzy Witold Sobera (born 4 September 1970) is a Polish former ice hockey player. He played for Polonia Bytom, Towimor Toruń, Cracovia, and SKH Sanok during his career. He also played for the Polish national team at the 1992 Winter Olympics. Sobera was a candidate in the 2010 Polish municipal elections for the city council of Ruda Śląska, but failed to win a seat.

References

External links
 

1970 births
Living people
Ice hockey players at the 1992 Winter Olympics
KH Sanok players
MKS Cracovia (ice hockey) players
Olympic ice hockey players of Poland
Polish ice hockey defencemen
Sportspeople from Bytom
TKH Toruń players
TMH Polonia Bytom players
Polish sportsperson-politicians